Harry Chippendale (2 October 1870 – 29 September 1952) was an English international footballer, who played as an outside right.

Career
Born in Blackburn, Chippendale started his career with Accrington but did not make a senior appearance for the club. After leaving Accrington, he had a spell with Nelson. Between 1891 and 1897 Chippendale played professionally for Blackburn Rovers, and earned one cap for England in 1894.

References

External links

1870 births
1952 deaths
English footballers
England international footballers
Accrington F.C. players
Nelson F.C. players
Blackburn Rovers F.C. players
English Football League players
Association football forwards